Systrafoss ("sisters' waterfall") is a waterfall in Iceland, found at Kirkjubæjarklaustur in Skaftárhreppur in the Suðurland region.

Geography
The waterfall is part of the river Fossá, which runs south from its source Systravatn. To the south of Systrafoss runs the glacial river Skaftá.

Name
Both the waterfall and Systravatn take their name from the sisters of the nearby Kirkjubæjar Abbey.

See also
 List of waterfalls of Iceland

Sources
 Jens Willhardt, Christine Sadler: Island. 3rd edn. Michael Müller, Erlangen 2003, p. 346f.
 Borowski, Birgit (ed.): Lonely Planet Publications Ltd. Melbourne: Island. 3rd German edn, Sept. 2013, p. 285

References

External links

 Systrafoss - video at Youtube

Waterfalls of Iceland